A polytropic process is a thermodynamic process that obeys the relation:

where p is the pressure, V is volume, n is the polytropic index, and C is a constant. The polytropic process equation describes expansion and compression processes which include heat transfer.

Particular cases
Some specific values of n correspond to particular cases:
 for an isobaric process,
 for an isochoric process.
In addition, when the ideal gas law applies:
 for an isothermal process,
 for an isentropic process.

Where  is the ratio of the heat capacity at constant pressure to heat capacity at constant volume.

Equivalence between the polytropic coefficient and the ratio of energy transfers

For an ideal gas in a closed system undergoing a slow process with negligible changes in kinetic and potential energy the process is polytropic, such that

where C is a constant, and with the polytropic coefficient .

Relationship to ideal processes
For certain values of the polytropic index, the process will be synonymous with other common processes. Some examples of the effects of varying index values are given in the following table.

When the index n is between any two of the former values (0, 1, γ, or ∞), it means that the polytropic curve will cut through (be bounded by) the curves of the two bounding indices.

For an ideal gas, 1 < γ < 5/3, since by Mayer's relation

Other
A solution to the Lane–Emden equation using a polytropic fluid is known as a polytrope.

See also
Adiabatic process
Compressor
Internal combustion engine
Isentropic process
Isobaric process
Isochoric process
Isothermal process
Polytrope
Quasistatic equilibrium
Thermodynamics
Vapor-compression refrigeration

References

Thermodynamic processes